Tessa Humphries is an Australian actress, best known for her appearances in television soap opera.

Humphries made her acting debut in Cassandra as the title character, and had also played Mary Reynolds in Sons and Daughters and Corinne Todd in Families. In 1995 she played Tracy in Sex Is a Four Letter Word. She also starred in Out of the Body as Neva St. Clair.

She is the daughter of comedian Barry Humphries and his second wife, Rosalind Tong and was married to producer Jason Buesst to whom she has two sons.

Filmography

References

External links
 

Living people
Australian television actresses
Place of birth missing (living people)
Year of birth missing (living people)